Theodore Robert Bundy (born Cowell; November 24, 1946 – January 24, 1989) was an American serial killer who kidnapped, raped and murdered numerous young women and girls during the 1970s and possibly earlier. After more than a decade of denials, he confessed to 30 murders committed in seven states between 1974 and 1978. His true victim total is unknown and likely significantly higher.

Bundy was often regarded as charismatic and handsome, traits he exploited to win the trust of both his victims and society as a whole. He typically approached women in public places, either asking for help by feigning a physical impairment such as an injury, or impersonating an authority figure. Once tricked into being led away, they would be bludgeoned unconscious and taken elsewhere to be sexually assaulted and killed. Bundy frequently revisited the bodies of those he abducted, grooming and performing sex acts on the corpses until decomposition and destruction by wild animals made any further interactions impossible. At least twelve of his victims were decapitated and their severed heads kept as mementos in his apartment. On a few occasions, he broke into homes at night and bludgeoned his victims as they slept.

In 1975, Bundy was arrested and jailed in Utah for aggravated kidnapping and attempted criminal assault. He then became a suspect in a progressively longer list of unsolved homicides in several states. Facing murder charges in Colorado, Bundy engineered two dramatic escapes and committed further assaults in Florida, including three murders, before his ultimate recapture in 1978. For the Florida homicides, he received three death sentences in two trials. Bundy was executed at Florida State Prison in Raiford on January 24, 1989.

Biographer Ann Rule characterized him as "a sadistic sociopath who took pleasure from another human's pain and the control he had over his victims, to the point of death and even after." Bundy once described himself as "the most cold-hearted son of a bitch you'll ever meet," a statement with which attorney Polly Nelson, a member of his last defense team, agreed. "Ted," she wrote, "was the very definition of heartless evil."

Early life

Childhood 
Ted Bundy was born Theodore Robert Cowell on November 24, 1946, to Eleanor Louise Cowell (September 21, 1924 – December 23, 2012, known by her middle name) at the Elizabeth Lund Home for Unwed Mothers in Burlington, Vermont. His biological father's identity has never been confirmed; his original birth certificate apparently assigns paternity to a salesman and United States Air Force veteran named Lloyd Marshall, though a copy of it listed his father as unknown. Louise claimed she met a war veteran named Jack Worthington, who abandoned her soon after she became pregnant. Census records reveal that several men by the name of "John Worthington" and "Lloyd Marshall" lived near Louise when Bundy was conceived. Some family members expressed suspicions that Bundy might have been fathered by Louise's own father. In the 2020 documentary film Crazy, Not Insane, psychiatrist Dorothy Otnow Lewis claimed she received a sample of Bundy's blood—though she did not specify from where—and had arranged a DNA test which confirmed that Bundy was not the product of incest.

For the first three years of his life, Bundy lived in the Philadelphia home of his maternal grandparents, Samuel Knecht Cowell (September 23, 1898 – December 4, 1983) and Eleanor Miriam Cowell née Longstreet (February 16, 1895 – April 25, 1971) who raised him as their son to avoid the social stigma that accompanied birth outside of wedlock at that time. Family, friends, and even young Ted were told that his grandparents were his parents and that his mother was his older sister. Bundy eventually discovered the truth, although his recollections of the circumstances varied; he told a girlfriend that a cousin showed him a copy of his birth certificate after calling him a "bastard," but he told biographers Stephen Michaud and Hugh Aynesworth that he had found the certificate himself. Biographer and true crime writer Ann Rule, who knew Bundy personally, wrote that he did not find out until 1969, when he located his original birth record in Vermont. Bundy expressed a lifelong resentment toward his mother for never talking to him about his real father, and for leaving him to discover his true parentage for himself.

Bundy occasionally exhibited disturbing behavior at an early age. Louise's younger sister Julia recalled awakening from a nap to find herself surrounded by knives from the kitchen, and three-year-old Ted standing by the bed, smiling. Bundy's childhood neighbor Sandi Holt described him as a bully, saying, "He liked to terrify people... He liked to be in charge. He liked to inflict pain and suffering and fear."

In some interviews, Bundy spoke warmly of his grandparents and told Rule that he "identified with," "respected," and "clung to" his grandfather. In 1987, however, he and other family members told attorneys that Samuel was a tyrannical bully who beat his wife and dog, exhibited bigotry (including religious intolerance, racism, and xenophobia), and swung neighborhood cats by their tails. In one instance, Samuel threw Julia down a flight of stairs for oversleeping. He sometimes spoke aloud to unseen presences, and at least once flew into a violent rage when the question of Bundy's paternity was raised. Bundy described his grandmother as a timid and obedient woman who periodically underwent electroconvulsive therapy for depression and feared to leave their house toward the end of her life. These descriptions of Bundy's grandparents have been questioned in more recent investigations. Some locals remembered Cowell as a "fine man", if a bit eccentric. A cousin of Bundy claimed that the negative characterizations of Cowell likely arose to explain why his grandson became a serial killer. In addition, Louise's sister Audrey stated that their mother could not leave her home because she suffered a stroke due to being overweight and was not mentally ill.

In 1950, Louise changed her surname from Cowell to Nelson and, at the urging of multiple family members, left Philadelphia with Ted to live with cousins Alan and Jane Scott in Tacoma, Washington. In 1951 she met Johnny Culpepper Bundy (April 23, 1921 – May 17, 2007), a hospital cook, at an adult singles night at Tacoma's First Methodist Church. They married later that year and Johnny formally adopted Ted. Johnny and Louise conceived four children together, and though Johnny tried to include his adopted son in camping trips and other family activities, Ted remained distant from him. He would later complain to a girlfriend that Johnny "was not his real father", "wasn't very bright," and "didn't make much money."

Bundy varied his recollections of Tacoma in later years. To Michaud and Aynesworth, he described roaming his neighborhood, picking through trash barrels in search of pictures of naked women  and to attorney and author Polly Nelson he said that he perused detective magazines, crime novels, and true crime documentaries for stories that involved sexual violence, particularly when the stories were illustrated with pictures of dead or maimed women. In a letter to Rule, however, he asserted that he "never, ever read fact-detective magazines, and shuddered at the thought that anyone would." He told Michaud that he would consume large quantities of alcohol and "canvass the community" late at night in search of undraped windows where he could observe women undressing, or "whatever [else] could be seen."

Accounts of Bundy's social life also varied. He told journalists Michaud and Aynesworth that he "chose to be alone" as an adolescent because he was unable to understand interpersonal relationships. He claimed that he had no natural sense of how to develop friendships. "I didn't know what made people want to be friends," Bundy said. "I didn't know what underlay social interactions." Classmates from Woodrow Wilson High School however, told Rule that Bundy was "well known and well liked" there, "a medium-sized fish in a large pond."

Bundy's only significant athletic avocation was downhill skiing, which he pursued enthusiastically with stolen equipment and forged lift tickets. During high school, he was arrested at least twice on suspicion of burglary and motor vehicle theft. When he reached age 18 the details of the incidents were expunged from his record, as is customary in Washington and many other states.

University years 
After graduating from high school in 1965, Bundy attended the University of Puget Sound (UPS) for one year before transferring to the University of Washington (UW) to study Chinese. In 1967, he became romantically involved with a UW classmate, Diane Edwards (identified in Bundy biographies by several pseudonyms, most commonly Stephanie Brooks). In early 1968, Bundy dropped out of college and worked a series of minimum-wage jobs. He also volunteered at the Seattle office of Nelson Rockefeller's presidential campaign and became Arthur Fletcher's driver and bodyguard during Fletcher's campaign for Lieutenant Governor of Washington State. Edwards graduated in the spring of 1968 and left Washington for San Francisco. Bundy visited her later that year after he earned a scholarship to study Chinese at Stanford University that summer.

In August, Bundy attended the 1968 Republican National Convention in Miami as a Rockefeller delegate. Shortly thereafter, Edwards ended their relationship and returned to her family home in California, frustrated by what she described as Bundy's immaturity and lack of ambition. Psychiatrist Dorothy Otnow Lewis would later pinpoint this crisis as "probably the pivotal time in his development". Devastated by the breakup, Bundy traveled to Colorado and then farther east, visiting relatives in Arkansas and Philadelphia and enrolling for one semester at Temple University. It was also at this time in early 1969, Rule believed, that Bundy visited the office of birth records in Burlington and confirmed his true parentage.

Bundy was back in Washington by the fall of 1969, when he met Elizabeth Kloepfer (identified in Bundy literature as Meg Anders, Beth Archer, or Liz Kendall), a single mother from Ogden, Utah, who worked as a secretary at the UW School of Medicine. Their tumultuous relationship would continue well past his initial incarceration in Utah in 1976. Bundy became a father figure to Kloepfer's daughter Molly, who was three-years-old when he started dating her mother; he remained in her life until she was aged 10, after he had been arrested. As an adult, Molly wrote of incidents beginning at age 7 in which Bundy was abusive or sexually inappropriate with her. Her accounts include Bundy hitting her in the face, knocking her down, putting her at risk of drowning, indecent exposure, and sexual touching disguised as accidents or "games."

In mid-1970, Bundy, now focused and goal-oriented, re-enrolled at UW, this time as a psychology major. He became an honor student and was well regarded by his professors. In 1971, he took a job at Seattle's Suicide Hotline Crisis Center. There, he met and worked alongside Ann Rule, a former Seattle police officer and aspiring crime writer who would later write one of the definitive Bundy biographies, The Stranger Beside Me. Rule saw nothing disturbing in Bundy's personality at the time; she described him as "kind, solicitous, and empathetic."

After graduating from UW in 1972, Bundy joined Governor Daniel J. Evans's re-election campaign. Posing as a college student, he shadowed Evans's opponent, former governor Albert Rosellini, and recorded his stump speeches for analysis by Evans's team. Evans appointed Bundy to the Seattle Crime Prevention Advisory Committee. After Evans was re-elected, Bundy was hired as an assistant to Ross Davis, Chairman of the Washington State Republican Party. Davis thought well of Bundy and described him as "smart, aggressive ... and a believer in the system." In early 1973, despite mediocre LSAT scores, Bundy was accepted into the law schools of UPS and the University of Utah on the strength of letters of recommendation from Evans, Davis, and several UW psychology professors.

During a trip to California on Republican Party business in the summer of 1973, Bundy rekindled his relationship with Edwards. She marveled at his transformation into a serious and dedicated professional who was seemingly on the cusp of a significant legal and political career. Bundy continued to date Kloepfer as well; neither woman was aware of the other's existence. In the fall of 1973, he matriculated at UPS Law School, and continued courting Edwards, who flew to Seattle several times to stay with him. They discussed marriage, and at one point he introduced her to Davis as his fiancée.

In January 1974, Bundy abruptly broke off all contact with Edwards; her phone calls and letters went unreturned.  When she finally reached him by phone a month later, she demanded to know why he had unilaterally ended their relationship without explanation.  In a flat, calm voice, he replied, "Diane, I have no idea what you mean," and hung up. She never heard from him again. Bundy later explained, "I just wanted to prove to myself that I could have married her"; but Edwards concluded in retrospect that he had deliberately planned the entire courtship and rejection in advance, as vengeance for the breakup she initiated in 1968. By then, Bundy had begun skipping classes at law school. By April he had stopped attending entirely, as young women began to disappear in the Pacific Northwest.

Entry into murder 
There is no consensus as to when or where Bundy began killing women. He told different stories to different people and refused to divulge the specifics of his earliest crimes, even as he confessed in graphic detail to dozens of later murders in the days preceding his execution. He told Nelson that he attempted his first kidnapping in 1969 in Ocean City, New Jersey, but did not kill anyone until sometime in 1971 in Seattle. He told psychologist Art Norman that he killed two women in Atlantic City while visiting family in Philadelphia in 1969. Bundy hinted to homicide detective Robert D. Keppel that he committed a murder in Seattle in 1972 and another murder in 1973 that involved a hitchhiker near Tumwater, but he refused to elaborate. Rule and Keppel both believed that he might have started killing as a teenager. Bundy's earliest documented homicides were committed in 1974, when he was 27-years-old. By his own admission, he had by then mastered the necessary skills—in the era before DNA profiling—to leave minimal incriminating forensic evidence at crime scenes.

First two series of murders

Washington, Oregon 
Shortly after midnight on January 4, 1974 (around the time that he terminated his relationship with Edwards), Bundy entered the basement apartment of 18-year-old Karen Sparks (often identified as Joni Lenz, Mary Adams, and Terri Caldwell in Bundy literature), a dancer and student at UW. After bludgeoning Sparks with a metal rod from her bed frame, he sexually assaulted her with either the same rod or a metal speculum, causing extensive internal injuries. She remained unconscious in the hospital for ten days and although she survived, she was left with physical disabilities. In the early morning hours of February 1, Bundy broke into the basement room of Lynda Ann Healy, a UW undergraduate who broadcast morning radio weather reports for skiers. He beat her unconscious; dressed her in blue jeans, a white blouse, and boots; and carried her away.

During the first half of 1974, female college students disappeared at the rate of about one per month. Two female Central Washington students later came forward to report encounters—one on the night of Rancourt's disappearance, the other three nights earlier—with a man wearing a sling, who was asking for help carrying a load of books to his brown or tan Volkswagen Beetle.

Investigators from Seattle and King County grew increasingly concerned. There was no significant physical evidence, and the missing women had little in common apart from similar appearance: young, attractive, white college students with long hair parted in the middle. On June 1, Brenda Carol Ball, 22, disappeared after leaving the Flame Tavern in Burien, near Seattle–Tacoma International Airport. She was last seen in the parking lot, talking to a brown-haired man with his arm in a sling.

In the early hours of June 11, UW student Georgann Hawkins vanished while walking down a brightly lit alley between her boyfriend's dormitory residence and her sorority house. The next morning, three Seattle homicide detectives and a criminalist combed the entire alleyway on their hands and knees, finding nothing. Bundy later told Keppel that he lured Hawkins to his car and knocked her unconscious with a crowbar. He later returned to the UW alley the morning after and, in the very midst of a major crime scene investigation, located and gathered Hawkins's earrings and one of her shoes where he had left them in the adjoining parking lot, and departed, unobserved. "It was a feat so brazen," wrote Keppel, "that it astonishes police even today." Bundy said he revisited Hawkins' corpse on three occasions.

After Hawkins's disappearance was publicized, witnesses came forward to report seeing a man in an alley behind a nearby dormitory on the night of her disappearance. He was on crutches with a leg cast and was struggling to carry a briefcase. One woman recalled that the man asked her to help him carry the case to his car, a light brown Volkswagen Beetle.

During this period, Bundy was working in Olympia as the assistant director of the Seattle Crime Prevention Advisory Commission, where he wrote a pamphlet for women on rape prevention. Later, he worked at the Department of Emergency Services (DES), a state government agency involved in the search for the missing women. At the DES he met and began dating Carole Ann Boone, a twice-divorced mother of two who would play an important role in the final phase of his life six years later.

Reports of the brutal attack on Sparks and the six missing women appeared prominently in newspapers and on television throughout Washington and Oregon. Fear spread among the population; hitchhiking by young women dropping sharply. Pressure mounted on law enforcement agencies, but the scarcity of physical evidence severely hampered them. Police would not provide reporters with the little information that was available for fear of compromising the investigation. Further similarities between the victims were noted: the disappearances all took place at night, usually near ongoing construction work, and were within a week of midterm or final exams.  All of the victims were wearing slacks or blue jeans when they disappeared, and at many crime scenes there were sightings of a man wearing a cast or a sling and driving a brown or tan Volkswagen Beetle.

The Oregon and Washington murders culminated on July14 with the broad daylight abductions of two women from a crowded beach at Lake Sammamish State Park in Issaquah. Four female witnesses described an attractive young man wearing a white tennis outfit with his left arm in a sling, speaking with a light accent, perhaps Canadian or British. Introducing himself as "Ted," he asked their help in unloading a sailboat from his tan or bronze-colored Volkswagen Beetle. Three refused (Sindi Siebenbam, Patricia Ann Turner, Jacqueline Plischke); one (Janice Graham) accompanied him as far as his car, saw that there was no sailboat, and fled. Three additional witnesses saw him approach Janice Anne Ott, 23, a probation caseworker at the King County Juvenile Court, with the sailboat story and watched her leave the beach in his company. About four hours later, Denise Marie Naslund, a 19-year-old woman who was studying to become a computer programmer, left a picnic to go to the restroom and never returned. Bundy told Stephen Michaud and William Hagmaier that Ott was still alive when he returned with Naslund and that he forced one to watch as he murdered the other, but he later denied it in an interview with Lewis on the eve of his execution.

King County police, finally armed with a detailed description of their suspect and his car, posted fliers throughout the Seattle area. A composite sketch was printed in regional newspapers and broadcast on local television stations. Kloepfer, Rule, a DES employee, and a UW psychology professor all recognized the profile, the sketch, and the car, and reported Bundy as a possible suspect; but detectives—who were receiving up to 200 tips per day—thought it unlikely that a clean-cut law student with no adult criminal record could be the perpetrator.

An extra femur and several vertebrae found at the site were later identified by Bundy as those of Hawkins. Six months later, forestry students from Green River Community College discovered the skulls and mandibles of Healy, Rancourt, Parks, and Ball on Taylor Mountain, where Bundy frequently hiked, just east of Issaquah. Manson's remains were never recovered.

Idaho, Utah, Colorado 

In August 1974, Bundy received a second acceptance from the University of Utah Law School and moved to Salt Lake City, leaving Kloepfer in Seattle. While he called Kloepfer often, he dated "at least a dozen" other women. As he studied the first-year law curriculum a second time, he was devastated to find out that the other students "had something, some intellectual capacity", that he did not. He found the classes completely incomprehensible. "It was a great disappointment to me," he said.

A new string of homicides began the following month, including two that would remain undiscovered until Bundy confessed to them shortly before his execution. On September 2, he raped and strangled a still-unidentified hitchhiker in Idaho, then either disposed of the remains immediately in a nearby river or returned the next day to photograph and dismember  On October 2, he abducted 16-year-old Nancy Wilcox in Holladay, Utah, a suburb of Salt Lake City.

On October 18, Melissa Anne Smith—the 17-year-old daughter of the police chief of Midvale, another Salt Lake City suburb—disappeared after leaving a pizza parlor. Her nude body was found in a nearby mountainous area nine days later; postmortem examination indicated that she may have remained alive for up to seven days following her disappearance. Her naked body was found by hikers  to the northeast in American Fork Canyon on Thanksgiving Day. Both girls had been beaten, raped, sodomized, and strangled with nylon stockings. Years later, Bundy described his postmortem rituals with the corpses of Smith and Aime, including hair shampooing and application of makeup.

In the late afternoon of November 8, Bundy approached 18-year-old telephone operator Carol DaRonch at Fashion Place Mall in Murray, less than a mile from the Midvale restaurant where Smith was last seen. He identified himself as "Officer Roseland" of the Murray Police Department and told DaRonch that someone had attempted to break into her car. He asked her to accompany him to the station to file a complaint. When DaRonch pointed out to Bundy that he was driving on a road that did not lead to the police station, he immediately pulled onto the shoulder and attempted to handcuff her. During their struggle, he inadvertently fastened both handcuffs to the same wrist, and DaRonch was able to open the car door and escape. The school's drama teacher and a student told police that "a stranger" had asked each of them to come out to the parking lot to identify a car. Another student later saw the same man pacing in the rear of the auditorium, and the drama teacher spotted him again shortly before the end of the play. Outside the auditorium, investigators found a key that unlocked the handcuffs removed from DaRonch's wrist.

In November, Kloepfer called King County police a second time after reading that young women were disappearing in towns surrounding Salt Lake City. Detective Randy Hergesheimer of the Major Crimes division interviewed her in detail. By then, Bundy had risen considerably on the King County hierarchy of suspicion, but the Lake Sammamish witness considered most reliable by detectives failed to identify him from a photo lineup. In December, Kloepfer called the Salt Lake County Sheriff's Office and repeated her suspicions. Bundy's name was added to their list of suspects, but at that time no credible forensic evidence linked him to the Utah crimes. In January 1975, Bundy returned to Seattle after his final exams and spent a week with Kloepfer, who did not tell him that she had reported him to police on three occasions. She made plans to visit him in Salt Lake City in August.

In 1975, Bundy shifted much of his criminal activity eastward, from his base in Utah to Colorado. Her nude body was found a month later next to a dirt road just outside the resort. She had been killed by blows to her head from a blunt instrument that left distinctive linear grooved depressions on her skull; her body also bore deep cuts from a sharp weapon. Weeks later, he made the six-hour drive from Salt Lake City to revisit her remains.

Denise Lynn Oliverson, 25, disappeared near the Utah–Colorado border in Grand Junction on April 6 while riding her bicycle to her parents' house; her bike and sandals were found under a viaduct near a railroad bridge. He drowned her in his hotel room, after which he disposed of her body in a river (likely the Snake River) north of Pocatello.

In mid-May, three of Bundy's Washington State DES coworkers, including Boone, visited him in Salt Lake City and stayed for a week in his apartment. He subsequently spent a week in Seattle with Kloepfer in early June and they discussed getting married the following Christmas. Again, Kloepfer made no mention of her multiple discussions with authorities in King County and Salt Lake County. Bundy disclosed neither his ongoing relationship with Boone nor a concurrent romance with a Utah law student known in various accounts as Kim Andrews or Sharon Auer.

Her murder became Bundy's last confession, tape-recorded moments before he entered the execution chamber. The bodies of Wilcox, Kent, Cunningham, Oliverson, Culver, and Curtis were never recovered.

In August or September 1975, Bundy was baptized into the Church of Jesus Christ of Latter-day Saints, although he was not an active participant in services and ignored most church restrictions. He would later be excommunicated by the LDS Church following his 1976 kidnapping conviction. When asked his religious preference after his arrest, Bundy answered "Methodist", the religion of his childhood.

In Washington State, investigators were still struggling to analyze the Pacific Northwest murder spree that had ended as abruptly as it had begun. In an effort to make sense of an overwhelming mass of data, they resorted to the then-innovative strategy of compiling a database. They used the King County payroll computer, a "huge, primitive machine" by contemporary standards, but the only one available for their use. After inputting the many lists they had compiled—classmates and acquaintances of each victim, Volkswagen owners named "Ted", known sex offenders, and so on—they queried the computer for coincidences. Out of thousands of names, 26 turned up on four lists; one was Ted Bundy. Detectives also manually compiled a list of their 100 "best" suspects, and Bundy was on that list as well. He was "literally at the top of the pile" of suspects when word came from Utah of his arrest.

Arrest and first trial 

On August 16, 1975, Bundy was arrested by Utah Highway Patrol officer Bob Hayward in Granger, another Salt Lake City suburb. Hayward observed Bundy cruising a residential area in his Volkswagen Beetle during the pre-dawn hours, and fleeing at high speed after seeing the patrol car. He noticed that the Volkswagen's front passenger seat had been removed and placed on the rear seats, and searched the car. He found a ski mask, a second mask fashioned from pantyhose, a crowbar, handcuffs, trash bags, a coil of rope, an ice pick, and other items initially assumed to be burglary tools. Bundy explained that the ski mask was for skiing, he had found the handcuffs in a dumpster, and the rest were common household items. However, Detective Jerry Thompson remembered a similar suspect and car description from the November 1974 DaRonch kidnapping, and Bundy's name from Kloepfer's phone call a month later. In a search of Bundy's apartment, police found a guide to Colorado ski resorts with a checkmark by the Wildwood Inn, and a brochure that advertised the Viewmont High School play in Bountiful, where Kent had disappeared. The police did not have sufficient evidence to detain Bundy, so he was released on his own recognizance. Bundy later said that searchers missed a hidden collection of Polaroid photographs of his victims, which he destroyed after he was released.

Salt Lake City police placed Bundy on 24-hour surveillance, and Thompson flew to Seattle with two other detectives to interview Kloepfer. She told them that in the year prior to Bundy's move to Utah, she had discovered objects that she "couldn't understand" in her house and in Bundy's apartment. These items included crutches, a bag of plaster of Paris that he admitted stealing from a medical supply house, and a meat cleaver that was never used for cooking. Additional objects included surgical gloves, an Oriental knife in a wooden case that he kept in his glove compartment, and a sack full of women's clothing. Bundy was perpetually in debt, and Kloepfer suspected that he had stolen almost everything of significant value that he possessed. When she confronted him over a new TV and stereo, he warned her, "If you tell anyone, I'll break your fucking neck." She said Bundy became "very upset" whenever she considered cutting her hair, which was long and parted in the middle. She would sometimes awaken in the middle of the night to find him under the bed covers with a flashlight, examining her body. He kept a lug wrench, taped halfway up the handle, in the trunk of her car—another Volkswagen Beetle, which he often borrowed—"for protection". The detectives confirmed that Bundy had not been with Kloepfer on any of the nights during which the Pacific Northwest victims had vanished, nor on the day Ott and Naslund were abducted from Lake Sammamish State Park. Shortly thereafter, Kloepfer was interviewed by Seattle homicide detective Kathy McChesney, and learned of the existence of Diane Edwards and her brief engagement to Bundy around Christmas 1973.

In September, Bundy sold his Volkswagen Beetle to a Midvale teenager. Utah police impounded it, and FBI technicians dismantled and searched it. They found hairs matching samples obtained from Campbell's body. Later, they also identified hair strands "microscopically indistinguishable" from those of Smith and DaRonch. FBI lab specialist Robert Neill concluded that the presence of hair strands in one car matching three different victims who had never met one another would be "a coincidence of mind-boggling rarity".

On October 2, detectives put Bundy into a lineup. DaRonch immediately identified him as "Officer Roseland", and witnesses from Bountiful recognized him as the stranger at the Viewmont High School auditorium. There was insufficient evidence to link him to Kent (whose body was never found), but more than enough evidence to charge him with aggravated kidnapping and attempted criminal assault in the DaRonch case. He was freed on $15,000 bail, paid by his parents, and spent most of the time between indictment and trial in Seattle, living in Kloepfer's house. Seattle police had insufficient evidence to charge him in the Pacific Northwest murders, but kept him under close surveillance. "When Ted and I stepped out on the porch to go somewhere," Kloepfer wrote, "so many unmarked police cars started up that it sounded like the beginning of the Indy 500."

In November, the three principal Bundy investigators—Jerry Thompson from Utah, Robert Keppel from Washington, and Michael Fisher from Colorado—met in Aspen, Colorado, and exchanged information with thirty detectives and prosecutors from five states. While officials left the meeting (later referred to as the Aspen Summit) convinced that Bundy was the murderer they sought, they agreed that more hard evidence would be needed before he could be charged with any of the murders.

In February 1976, Bundy stood trial for the DaRonch kidnapping. On the advice of his attorney, John O'Connell, he waived his right to a jury due to the negative publicity surrounding the case. After a four-day bench trial and a weekend of deliberation, Judge Stewart Hanson Jr. found him guilty of kidnapping and assault. In June he was sentenced to one to 15 years in the Utah State Prison. In October, he was found hiding in bushes in the prison yard carrying an "escape kit"—road maps, airline schedules, and a social security card—and spent several weeks in solitary confinement. Later that month, Colorado authorities charged him with Campbell's murder. After a period of resistance, he waived extradition proceedings and was transferred to Aspen in January 1977.

Escapes 

On June 7, 1977, Bundy was transported  from the Garfield County jail in Glenwood Springs to Pitkin County Courthouse in Aspen for a preliminary hearing. He had elected to serve as his own attorney, and as such, was excused by the judge from wearing handcuffs or leg shackles. During a recess, he asked to visit the courthouse's law library to research his case. While shielded from his guards' view behind a bookcase, he opened a window and jumped to the ground from the second story, injuring his right ankle as he landed.

After shedding an outer layer of clothing, Bundy limped through Aspen as roadblocks were being set up on its outskirts, then hiked south onto Aspen Mountain. Near its summit he broke into a hunting cabin and stole food, clothing, and a rifle. The following day, he left the cabin and continued south toward the town of Crested Butte, but became lost in the forest. For two days he wandered aimlessly on the mountain, missing two trails that led downward to his intended destination. Three days later, he stole a car at the edge of Aspen Golf Course. Cold, sleep-deprived, and in constant pain from his sprained ankle, Bundy drove back into Aspen, where two police officers noticed his car weaving in and out of its lane and pulled him over. He had been a fugitive for six days. In the car were maps of the mountain area around Aspen that prosecutors were using to demonstrate the location of Campbell's body (as his own attorney, Bundy had rights of discovery), indicating that his escape was not a spontaneous act, but had been planned.

Back in jail in Glenwood Springs, Bundy ignored the advice of friends and legal advisors to stay put. The case against him, already weak at best, was deteriorating steadily as pretrial motions consistently resolved in his favor and significant bits of evidence were ruled inadmissible. "A more rational defendant might have realized that he stood a good chance of acquittal, and that beating the murder charge in Colorado would probably have dissuaded other prosecutors ... with as little as a year and a half to serve on the DaRonch conviction, had Ted persevered, he could have been a free man." Instead, Bundy assembled a new escape plan. He acquired a detailed floor plan of the Garfield County jail and a hacksaw blade from other inmates. He further accumulated $500 in cash, something he later said was smuggled in over a six month period by visitors—Boone in particular. During the evenings, while other prisoners were showering, he sawed a hole about one square foot (0.093 m2) between the steel reinforcing bars in his cell's ceiling. Having lost , he was able to wriggle through and explore the crawl space above, allowing him to make a series of practice runs in the weeks that followed. Multiple reports from an informant of movement within the ceiling during the night were not investigated.

By late 1977, Bundy's impending trial had become a cause célèbre in the small town of Aspen, and Bundy filed a motion for a change of venue to Denver. On December 23, the Aspen trial judge granted the request—but to Colorado Springs, where juries had historically been hostile to murder suspects. On the night of December 30, with most of the jail staff on Christmas break and nonviolent prisoners on furlough with their families, Bundy piled books and files in his bed, covered them with a blanket to simulate his sleeping body, and climbed into the crawl space. He broke through the ceiling into the apartment of the chief jailer—who was out for the evening with his wife—changed into street clothes from the jailer's closet, and walked out the front door to freedom.

After stealing a car, Bundy drove eastward out of Glenwood Springs, but the car soon broke down in the mountains on Interstate 70. A passing motorist gave him a ride into Vail,  to the east. From there he caught a bus to Denver, where he boarded a morning flight to Chicago. Back in Glenwood Springs, the jail's skeleton crew did not discover the escape until noon on December 31, more than seventeen hours later. By then, Bundy was already in Chicago.

Florida 

From Chicago, Bundy traveled by train to Ann Arbor, Michigan, where he was present in a local tavern on January 2. Five days later, he stole a car and drove south to Atlanta, where he boarded a bus and arrived in Tallahassee, Florida, on the morning of January 8. He stayed for one night at a hotel before he rented a room under the alias Chris Hagen at a boarding house near the Florida State University (FSU) campus. Bundy later said that he initially resolved to find legitimate employment and refrain from further criminal activity, knowing he could probably remain free and undetected in Florida indefinitely as long as he did not attract the attention of police; but his lone job application, at a construction site, had to be abandoned when he was asked to produce identification. He reverted to his old habits of shoplifting and stealing money and credit cards from women's wallets left in shopping carts at local grocery stores.

In the early hours of January 15, 1978—one week after his arrival in Tallahassee—Bundy gained access to FSU's Chi Omega sorority house through a rear door with a faulty locking mechanism. Beginning at about 2:45 a.m. he bludgeoned Margaret Bowman, 21, with a heavy piece of oak firewood as she slept, crushing her skull. He then garroted her with a nylon stocking and ripped her underwear off with such force that friction burns were found on one of her thighs. After killing Bowman, he walked directly across the hall and entered the bedroom of 20-year-old Lisa Levy, beating her unconscious and strangling her. In what would become one of the key pieces of evidence against him at his trial, Bundy bit deeply into Levy's left buttock and through one of her nipples, nearly severing it from her right breast. Using a bottle of hair mist Levy had in her room, he raped her vaginally and anally in an assault so violent that it ruptured her internal organs. In an adjoining bedroom he attacked Kathy Kleiner, breaking her jaw and deeply lacerating her shoulder; and Karen Chandler, who suffered a concussion, broken jaw, loss of teeth, and a crushed finger. Chandler and Kleiner survived the attack; Kleiner attributed their survival to automobile headlights illuminating the interior of their room and frightening away the attacker. Fleeing the scene, Bundy was spotted by sorority sister Nita Neary, who came through the back door and saw him as he made a run for it. Tallahassee detectives determined that the four attacks took place in a total of less than fifteen minutes, within earshot of more than thirty witnesses who heard nothing.

Police converged on the sorority house not long after Bundy's rampage and began investigating the scene. Initially, the puncture wound through Levy's nipple briefly caused some to believe there had been a shooting at the sorority house, mistakenly believing it was a gunshot wound and not a bite mark. Although seriously injured and unconscious, Levy survived the assault at first but died shortly thereafter en-route to the hospital. Within the next hour, Bundy donned a makeshift pantyhose "mask" with holes cut out for him to see through and made his way to a duplex house eight blocks away, where he approached the apartment's basement window and climbed through under the cover of darkness. Finding FSU student Cheryl Thomas asleep in her bed at around 4:00 a.m., Bundy viciously attacked her, dislocating her shoulder as well as fracturing her jaw and skull in five places. She was left with permanent deafness and equilibrium damage that ended her dance career. For unknown reasons, Bundy pulled his mask off and dropped it on the bed. Thomas' neighbors in the rooms adjacent overheard the racket and phoned the police, who discovered her lying in bed badly beaten. In addition to the mask he had left behind, which contained hairs "similar to Bundy's in class and characteristic", the police also found a semen stain on the bed, though there was no evidence of sexual assault. The fact that Bundy attacked Thomas so soon after the murders of Bowman and Levy was something that bewildered law enforcement, with Sheriff Ken Katsaris initially expressing shock and disbelief that the same person would strike twice in such a short time span.

In a parking lot he approached 14-year-old Leslie Parmenter, the daughter of the Jacksonville Police Department's Chief of Detectives, identifying himself as "Richard Burton, Fire Department", but retreated when Parmenter's older brother arrived and confronted him. That afternoon, he backtracked  westward to Lake City. At Lake City Junior High School the following morning, 12-year-old Kimberly Dianne Leach was summoned to her homeroom by a teacher to retrieve a forgotten purse; she never returned to class. Forensic experts surmised that Leach had been raped before having her throat cut.

On February 12, with insufficient cash to pay his overdue rent and a growing suspicion that police were closing in on him, Bundy stole a car and fled Tallahassee, driving westward across the Florida Panhandle. Three days later, at around 1:00 a.m., he was stopped by Pensacola police officer David Lee near the Alabama state line after a "wants and warrants" check showed his Volkswagen Beetle was stolen. When told he was under arrest, Bundy kicked Lee's legs out from under him and took off running. Lee fired two warning shots, then gave chase and tackled him. The two struggled over Lee's gun before the officer finally subdued and arrested Bundy. In the stolen vehicle were three sets of IDs belonging to female FSU students, 21 stolen credit cards and a stolen television set. Also found were a pair of dark-rimmed non-prescription glasses and a pair of plaid slacks, later identified as the disguise worn by "Richard Burton, Fire Department" in Jacksonville. As Lee transported his suspect to jail, unaware that he had just arrested one of the FBI's Ten Most Wanted Fugitives, he heard Bundy say, "I wish you had killed me."

Florida trials, marriage 

Following a change of venue to Miami, Bundy stood trial for the Chi Omega homicides and assaults in June 1979. The trial was covered by 250 reporters from five continents and was the first to be televised nationally in the United States. Despite the presence of five court-appointed attorneys, Bundy again handled much of his own defense. From the beginning, he "sabotaged the entire defense effort out of spite, distrust, and grandiose delusion", Nelson later wrote. "Ted [was] facing murder charges, with a possible death sentence, and all that mattered to him apparently was that he be in charge."

According to Mike Minerva, a Tallahassee public defender and member of the defense team, a pre-trial plea bargain was negotiated in which Bundy would plead guilty to killing Levy, Bowman, and Leach in exchange for a firm 75-year prison sentence. Prosecutors were amenable to a deal, by one account, because "prospects of losing at trial were very good." Bundy, on the other hand, saw the plea deal not only as a means of avoiding the death penalty, but also as a "tactical move": he could enter his plea, then wait a few years for evidence to disintegrate or become lost and for witnesses to die, move on, or retract their testimony. Once the case against him had deteriorated beyond repair, he could file a post-conviction motion to set aside the plea and secure an acquittal. At the last minute, however, Bundy refused the deal. "It made him realize he was going to have to stand up in front of the whole world and say he was guilty", Minerva said. "He just couldn't do it."

At trial, crucial testimony came from Chi Omega sorority members Connie Hastings, who placed Bundy in the vicinity of the sorority house that evening, and Nita Neary, who saw him leaving the house clutching the murder weapon. Incriminating physical evidence included impressions of the bite wounds Bundy had inflicted on Levy's left buttock, which forensic odontologists Richard Souviron and Lowell Levine matched to castings of Bundy's teeth. The jury deliberated for less than seven hours before convicting Bundy on July 24, 1979, of the Bowman and Levy murders, three counts of attempted first-degree murder (for the assaults on Kleiner, Chandler and Thomas) and two counts of burglary. Trial judge Edward Cowart imposed death sentences for the murder convictions.

Six months later, a second trial took place in Orlando for the abduction and murder of Leach. Bundy was found guilty once again, after less than eight hours' deliberation, due principally to the testimony of an eyewitness who saw him leading Leach from the schoolyard to his stolen van. Important material evidence included clothing fibers with an unusual manufacturing error, found in the van and on Leach's body, which matched fibers from the jacket Bundy was wearing when he was arrested.

During the penalty phase of the Leach trial, Bundy took advantage of an obscure Florida law providing that a marriage declaration in court, in the presence of a judge, constituted a legal marriage. As he was questioning Boone—who had moved to Florida to be near Bundy, had testified on his behalf during both trials, and was again testifying on his behalf as a character witness—he asked her to marry him. She accepted, and Bundy declared to the court that they were legally married.

On February 10, 1980, Bundy was sentenced for a third time to death by electrocution. As the sentence was announced, he reportedly stood and shouted, "Tell the jury they were wrong!" This third death sentence would be the one ultimately carried out nearly nine years later.

In October 1981, Boone gave birth to a daughter, Rose, and named Bundy as the father. While conjugal visits were not allowed at the Florida State Prison in Raiford, where Bundy was incarcerated, inmates were known to pool their money in order to bribe guards to allow them intimate time alone with their female visitors.

Death row, confessions and execution 
Shortly after the conclusion of the Leach trial and the beginning of the long appeals process that followed, Bundy initiated a series of interviews with Stephen Michaud and Hugh Aynesworth. Speaking mostly in third person to avoid "the stigma of confession", he began for the first time to divulge details of his crimes and thought processes.

Bundy recounted his career as a thief, confirming Kloepfer's long-time suspicion that he had shoplifted virtually everything of substance that he owned. "The big payoff for me," he said, "was actually possessing whatever it was I had stolen. I really enjoyed having something ... that I had wanted and gone out and taken." Possession proved to be an important motive for rape and murder as well. Sexual assault, he said, fulfilled his need to "totally possess" his victims. At first, he killed his victims "as a matter of expediency ... to eliminate the possibility of [being] caught"; but later, murder became part of the "adventure". "The ultimate possession was, in fact, the taking of the life", he said. "And then ... the physical possession of the remains."

Bundy also confided in Special Agent William Hagmaier of the FBI Behavioral Analysis Unit. Hagmaier was struck by the "deep, almost mystical satisfaction" that Bundy took in murder. "He said that after a while, murder is not just a crime of lust or violence", Hagmaier related. "It becomes possession. They are part of you ... [the victim] becomes a part of you, and you [two] are forever one ... and the grounds where you kill them or leave them become sacred to you, and you will always be drawn back to them." Bundy told Hagmaier that he considered himself to be an "amateur", an "impulsive" killer in his early years, before moving into what he termed his "prime" or "predator" phase at about the time of Healy's murder in 1974. This implied that he began killing well before 1974—although he never explicitly admitted having done so.

In July 1984, prison guards found two hacksaw blades hidden in Bundy's cell. A steel bar in one of the cell's windows had been sawed completely through at the top and bottom and glued back into place with a homemade soap-based adhesive. Several months later, guards found an unauthorized mirror, and Bundy was moved to a different cell. Shortly thereafter, he was charged with a disciplinary infraction for unauthorized correspondence with another high-profile criminal, John Hinckley Jr.

In October 1984, Bundy contacted Keppel and offered to share his self-proclaimed expertise in serial killer psychology in the ongoing hunt in Washington for the "Green River Killer", later identified as Gary Ridgway. Keppel and Green River Task Force detective Dave Reichert interviewed Bundy, but Ridgway remained at large for a further seventeen years. Keppel published a detailed documentation of the Green River interviews, and later collaborated with Michaud on another examination of the interview material.

In early 1986, an execution date (March 4) was set on the Chi Omega convictions; the U.S. Supreme Court issued a brief stay, but the execution was quickly rescheduled. In April, shortly after the new date (July 2) was announced, Bundy finally confessed to Hagmaier and Nelson what they believed was the full range of his depredations, including details of what he did to some of his victims after their deaths. He told them that he revisited Taylor Mountain, Issaquah, and other secondary crime scenes, often several times, to lie with his victims and perform sexual acts with their bodies until putrefaction forced him to stop. In some cases, he drove for several hours each way and remained the entire night. In Utah, he applied makeup to Smith's lifeless face, and repeatedly washed Aime's hair. "If you've got time," he told Hagmaier, "they can be anything you want them to be." He decapitated approximately twelve of his victims with a hacksaw, and kept at least one group of severed heads—probably the four later found on Taylor Mountain (Rancourt, Parks, Ball and Healy)—in his apartment for a period of time before disposing of them.

Less than fifteen hours before the scheduled July 2 execution, the Eleventh Circuit Court of Appeals stayed it indefinitely and remanded the Chi Omega case for review on multiple technicalities—including Bundy's mental competency to stand trial and an erroneous instruction by the trial judge during the penalty phase requiring the jury to break a 6–6 tie between life imprisonment and the death penalty—which, ultimately, were never resolved. A new date (November 18) was then set to carry out the Leach sentence; the Eleventh Circuit Court issued a stay on November 17. In mid-1988, the Eleventh Circuit ruled against Bundy, and in December the Supreme Court denied a motion to review the ruling over the dissents of Justices Thurgood Marshall and William J. Brennan Jr.. Within hours of that final denial, a firm execution date of January 24, 1989, was announced. Bundy's journey through the appeals courts had been unusually rapid for a capital murder case: "Contrary to popular belief, the courts moved Bundy as fast as they could ... Even the prosecutors acknowledged that Bundy's lawyers never employed delaying tactics. Though people everywhere seethed at the apparent delay in executing the archdemon, Ted Bundy was actually on the fast track."

With all appeal avenues exhausted and no further motivation to deny his crimes, Bundy agreed to speak frankly with investigators. He confessed to Keppel that he had committed all eight of the Washington and Oregon homicides for which he was the prime suspect. He described three additional previously unknown victims in Washington and two in Oregon whom he declined to identify (if indeed he ever knew their identities). He said he left a fifth corpse—Manson's—on Taylor Mountain, but incinerated her head in Kloepfer's fireplace. "He described the Issaquah crime scene [where the bones of Ott, Naslund, and Hawkins were found], and it was almost like he was just there", Keppel said. "Like he was seeing everything. He was infatuated with the idea because he spent so much time there. He is just totally consumed with murder all the time." Nelson's impressions were similar: "It was the absolute misogyny of his crimes that stunned me," she wrote, "his manifest rage against women. He had no compassion at all ... he was totally engrossed in the details. His murders were his life's accomplishments."

Bundy confessed to detectives from Idaho, Utah, and Colorado that he had committed numerous additional homicides, including several that were unknown to the police. He explained that when he was in Utah he could bring his victims back to his apartment, "where he could reenact scenarios depicted on the covers of detective magazines." A new ulterior strategy quickly became apparent: he withheld many details, hoping to parlay the incomplete information into yet another stay of execution. "There are other buried remains in Colorado", he admitted, but refused to elaborate. The new strategy—immediately dubbed "Ted's bones-for-time scheme"—served only to deepen the resolve of authorities to see Bundy executed on schedule, and yielded little new detailed information. In cases where he did give details, nothing was found. Colorado detective Matt Lindvall interpreted this as a conflict between his desire to postpone his execution by divulging information and his need to remain in "total possession—the only person who knew his victims' true resting places."

When it became clear that no further stays would be forthcoming from the courts, Bundy supporters began lobbying for the only remaining option, executive clemency. Diana Weiner, a young Florida attorney and Bundy's last purported love interest, asked the families of several Colorado and Utah victims to petition Florida Governor Bob Martinez for a postponement to give Bundy time to reveal more information. All refused. "The families already believed that the victims were dead and that Ted had killed them", wrote Nelson. "They didn't need his confession." Martinez made it clear that he would not agree to further delays in any case. "We are not going to have the system manipulated", he told reporters. "For him to be negotiating for his life over the bodies of victims is despicable."

Boone had championed Bundy's innocence throughout all of his trials and felt "deeply betrayed" by his admission that he was, in fact, guilty. She moved back to Washington with her daughter and refused to accept his phone call on the morning of his execution. "She was hurt by his relationship with Diana [Weiner]," Nelson wrote, "and devastated by his sudden wholesale confessions in his last days."

Hagmaier was present during Bundy's final interviews with investigators. On the eve of his execution, he talked of suicide. "He did not want to give the state the satisfaction of watching him die", Hagmaier said.

Bundy was executed in the Raiford electric chair at 7:16 a.m. EST on Tuesday, January 24, 1989. His last words were directed at his attorney Jim Coleman and Methodist minister Fred Lawrence: "Jim and Fred, I'd like you to give my love to my family and friends." Hundreds of revelers sang, danced and set off fireworks in a pasture across from the prison as the execution was carried out, then cheered as the white hearse containing Bundy's corpse departed the prison. He was cremated in Gainesville, and his ashes scattered at an undisclosed location in the Cascade Range of Washington State, in accordance with his will.

Modus operandi and victim profiles 
Bundy was an unusually organized and calculating criminal who used his extensive knowledge of law enforcement methodologies to elude identification and capture for years. His crime scenes were distributed over large geographic areas; his victim count had risen to at least 20 before it became clear that numerous investigators in widely disparate jurisdictions were hunting the same man. Bundy's assault methods of choice were blunt trauma and strangulation, two relatively silent techniques that could be accomplished with common household items. He deliberately avoided firearms due to the noise they made and the ballistic evidence they left behind. He was a "meticulous researcher" who explored his surroundings in minute detail, looking for safe sites to seize and dispose of victims. He was unusually skilled at minimizing physical evidence. His fingerprints were never found at a crime scene, nor any other incontrovertible evidence of his guilt, a fact he repeated often during the years in which he attempted to maintain his innocence.

Other significant obstacles for law enforcement were Bundy's generic, essentially anonymous physical features, and a curious chameleon-like ability to change his appearance almost at will. Early on, police complained of the futility of showing his photograph to witnesses; he looked different in virtually every photo ever taken of him. In person, "his expression would so change his whole appearance that there were moments that you weren't even sure you were looking at the same person", said Stewart Hanson Jr., the judge in the DaRonch trial. "He [was] really a changeling." Bundy was well aware of this unusual quality and he exploited it, using subtle modifications of facial hair or hairstyle to significantly alter his appearance as necessary. He concealed his one distinctive identifying mark, a dark mole on his neck, with turtleneck shirts and sweaters. Even his Volkswagen Beetle proved difficult to pin down; its color was variously described by witnesses as metallic or non-metallic, tan or bronze, light brown or dark brown.

Bundy's modus operandi evolved in organization and sophistication over time, as is typical of serial killers, according to FBI experts. Early on, it consisted of forcible late-night entry followed by a violent attack with a blunt weapon on a sleeping victim. As his methodology evolved, he became progressively more organized in his choice of victims and crime scenes. He would employ various ruses designed to lure his victim to the vicinity of his vehicle where he had pre-positioned a weapon, usually a crowbar. In many cases he wore a plaster cast on one leg or a sling on one arm, and sometimes hobbled on crutches, then requested assistance in carrying something to his vehicle. Bundy was regarded as handsome and charismatic, traits he exploited to win the confidence of his victims and the people around him in his daily life. "Ted lured females", Michaud wrote, "the way a lifeless silk flower can dupe a honey bee." In situations where his looks and charm were not useful, he invoked authority by identifying himself as a police officer or firefighter. Once Bundy had them near or inside his vehicle, he would overpower and bludgeon them, and then restrain them with handcuffs. He would then transport them to a pre-selected secondary site, often a considerable distance away, and rape them during the act of ligature strangulation. In the case of his Utah victims, the secondary site would be his apartment building. Toward the end of his spree, in Florida, perhaps under the stress of being a fugitive, he regressed to indiscriminate attacks on sleeping victims. Speaking in the third person, Bundy insisted that he never deliberately tortured any of those he killed and that the murders had no sadistic focus on enjoyment derived from the infliction of pain and injury. To the contrary, he claimed that he went out of his way to ensure his victims did not suffer. "He received no pleasure from harming or causing pain to the person he attacked..." Bundy told Michaud. "He received absolutely no gratification from causing pain and did everything possible, within reason—considering the unreasonableness of the situation—not to torture these individuals, at least physically."

At secondary sites Bundy would remove and later burn the victim's clothing, or in at least one case (Cunningham's) deposit them in a Goodwill Industries collection bin. He explained that the clothing removal was ritualistic, but also a practical matter, as it minimized the chance of leaving trace evidence at the crime scene that could implicate him. A manufacturing error in fibers from his own clothing, ironically, provided a crucial incriminating link to the Leach killing. He often revisited his secondary crime scenes to engage in acts of necrophilia, and to groom or dress up the cadavers. Some victims were found wearing articles of clothing they had never worn, or nail polish that family members had never seen. Bundy took Polaroid photos of many of his victims. "When you work hard to do something right," he told Hagmaier, "you don't want to forget it." Consumption of large quantities of alcohol was an "essential component", he told both Keppel and Michaud; he needed to be "extremely drunk" while on the prowl in order to "significantly diminish" his inhibitions and to "sedate" the "dominant personality" that he feared might prevent his inner "entity" from acting on his impulses.

All of Bundy's known victims were white females, most of middle-class backgrounds. Almost all were between the ages of 15 and 25 and most were college students. He apparently never approached anyone he might have met before. In their last conversation before his execution, Bundy told Kloepfer he had purposely stayed away from her "when he felt the power of his sickness building in him." Rule noted that most of the identified victims had long straight hair, parted in the middle—like Diane Edwards, the woman who rejected him, and to whom he later became engaged and then rejected in return. Rule speculated that Bundy's animosity toward his first girlfriend triggered his protracted rampage and caused him to target victims who resembled her. Bundy dismissed this hypothesis: "[T]hey ... just fit the general criteria of being young and attractive", he told Aynesworth. "Too many people have bought this crap that all the girls were similar ... [but] almost everything was dissimilar ... physically, they were almost all different." He did concede that youth and beauty were "absolutely indispensable criteria" in his choice of victims.

After Bundy's execution, Rule was surprised and troubled to hear from numerous "sensitive, intelligent, kind young women" who wrote or called to say they were deeply depressed because Bundy was dead. Many had corresponded with him, "each believing that she was his only one". Several said they suffered nervous breakdowns when he died. "Even in death, Ted damaged women," Rule wrote. "To get well, they must realize that they were conned by the master con-man. They are grieving for a shadow man that never existed."

Pathology 

Bundy underwent multiple psychiatric examinations; the experts' conclusions varied. Dorothy Otnow Lewis, a professor of psychiatry at the New York University School of Medicine and an authority on violent behavior, initially made a diagnosis of bipolar disorder, but later changed her impression more than once. She also suggested the possibility of a multiple personality disorder, based on behaviors described in interviews and court testimony; a great-aunt witnessed an episode during which Bundy "seemed to turn into another, unrecognizable person ... [she] suddenly, inexplicably found herself afraid of her favorite nephew as they waited together at a dusk-darkened train station. He had turned into a stranger." Lewis recounted a prison official in Tallahassee describing a similar transformation: "He said, 'He became weird on me.' He did a metamorphosis, a body and facial change, and he felt there was almost an odor emitting from him. He said, 'Almost a complete change of personality ... that was the day I was afraid of him.

While experts found Bundy's precise diagnosis elusive, the majority of evidence pointed away from bipolar disorder or other psychoses, and toward antisocial personality disorder (ASPD). Bundy displayed many personality traits typically found in ASPD patients (who are often identified as "sociopaths" or "psychopaths"), such as outward charm and charisma with little true personality or genuine insight beneath the facade; the ability to distinguish right from wrong, but with minimal effect on behavior; and an absence of guilt or remorse. "Guilt doesn't solve anything, really", Bundy said, in 1981. "It hurts you ... I guess I am in the enviable position of not having to deal with guilt." There was also evidence of narcissism, poor judgment, and manipulative behavior. Upon assessment using the Psychopathy Checklist–revised (PCL-R), Bundy was reportedly evaluated as 39/40. Prosecutor George Dekle wrote, "Sociopaths are egotistical manipulators who think they can con anybody." "Sometimes he manipulates even me", admitted one psychiatrist. In the end, Lewis agreed with the majority: "I always tell my graduate students that if they can find me a real, true psychopath, I'll buy them dinner", she told Nelson. "I never thought they existed ... but I think Ted may have been one, a true psychopath, without any remorse or empathy at all." Narcissistic personality disorder (NPD) has been proposed as an alternative diagnosis in at least one subsequent retrospective analysis.

On the afternoon before he was executed, Bundy granted an interview to James Dobson, a psychologist and founder of the Christian evangelical organization Focus on the Family. He used the opportunity to make new claims about violence in the media and the pornographic "roots" of his crimes. "It happened in stages, gradually", he said. "My experience with ... pornography that deals on a violent level with sexuality, is once you become addicted to it ... I would keep looking for more potent, more explicit, more graphic kinds of material. Until you reach a point where the pornography only goes so far ... where you begin to wonder if maybe actually doing it would give that which is beyond just reading it or looking at it." Violence in the media, he said, "particularly sexualized violence", sent boys "down the road to being Ted Bundys." The FBI, he suggested, should stake out adult movie houses and follow patrons as they leave. "You are going to kill me," he said, "and that will protect society from me. But out there are many, many more people who are addicted to pornography, and you are doing nothing about that."

While Nelson was apparently convinced that Bundy's concern was genuine, most biographers, researchers, and other observers have concluded that his sudden condemnation of pornography was one last manipulative attempt to shift blame by catering to Dobson's agenda as a longtime pornography critic. He told Dobson that "true crime" detective magazines had "corrupted" him and "fueled [his] fantasies ... to the point of becoming a serial killer"; yet in a 1977 letter to Rule, he wrote, "Who in the world reads these publications? ... I have never purchased such a magazine, and [on only] two or three occasions have I ever picked one up." He told Michaud and Aynsworth in 1980, and Hagmaier the night before he spoke to Dobson, that pornography played a negligible role in his development as a serial killer. "The problem wasn't pornography", wrote Dekle. "The problem was Bundy." "I wish I could believe that his motives were altruistic," wrote Rule. "But all I can see in that Dobson tape is another Ted Bundy manipulation of our minds. The effect of the tape is to place, once again, the onus of his crimes, not on himself, but on us."

Rule and Aynesworth both noted that for Bundy, the fault always lay with someone or something else. While he eventually confessed to thirty murders, he never accepted responsibility for any of them, even when offered that opportunity prior to the Chi Omega trial, which would have spared him the death penalty. He deflected blame onto a wide variety of scapegoats, including his abusive grandfather, the absence of his biological father, the concealment of his true parentage by his mother, alcohol, the media, the police (whom he accused of planting evidence), society in general, violence on television, and, ultimately, true crime periodicals and pornography. He blamed television programming, which he watched mostly on sets that he had stolen, for "brainwashing" him into stealing credit cards. On at least one occasion, he even tried to blame his victims: "I have known people who ... radiate vulnerability", he wrote in a 1977 letter to Kloepfer. "Their facial expressions say 'I am afraid of you.' These people invite abuse ... By expecting to be hurt, do they subtly encourage it?"

A significant element of delusion permeated his thinking:

Bundy was always surprised when anyone noticed that one of his victims was missing, because he imagined America to be a place where everyone is invisible except to themselves. And he was always astounded when people testified that they had seen him in incriminating places, because Bundy did not believe people noticed each other.

"I don't know why everyone is out to get me", he complained to Lewis. "He really and truly did not have any sense of the enormity of what he had done," she said. "A long-term serial killer erects powerful barriers to his guilt," Keppel wrote, "walls of denial that can sometimes never be breached." Nelson agreed. "Each time he was forced to make an actual confession," she wrote, "he had to leap a steep barrier he had built inside himself long ago."

Victims

Confirmed 
The night before his execution, Bundy confessed to 30 homicides, but the true total remains unknown. Published estimates have run as high as 100 or more, and Bundy occasionally made cryptic comments to encourage that speculation. He told Aynesworth in 1980 that for every murder "publicized", there "could be one that was not." When FBI agents proposed a total tally of 36, Bundy responded, "Add one digit to that, and you'll have it." Years later he told Nelson that the common estimate of 35 was accurate, but Keppel wrote that "[Ted] and I both knew [the total] was much higher." "I don't think even he knew ... how many he killed, or why he killed them", said Rev. Fred Lawrence, the Methodist clergyman who administered Bundy's last rites. "That was my impression, my strong impression."

On the evening before his execution, Bundy reviewed his victim tally with Hagmaier on a state-by-state basis for a total of 30 homicides:
 in Washington, 11 (including Parks, abducted in Oregon but killed in Washington; and including 3 unidentified)
 in Utah, 8 (3 unidentified)
 in Colorado, 3
 in Florida, 3
 in Oregon, 2 (both unidentified)
 in Idaho, 2 (1 unidentified)
 in California, 1 (unidentified)
The following is a chronological summary of the 20 identified victims and five identified survivors:

1974

Washington, Oregon 
 January 4: Karen Sparks (often identified as Joni Lenz in Bundy literature) (18): Bludgeoned and sexually assaulted in her bed as she slept; survived.
 February 1: Lynda Ann Healy (21): Bludgeoned while asleep and abducted, was then decapitated and dismembered post-mortem; mandible recovered at Taylor Mountain site in 1975.
 March 12: Donna Gail Manson (19): Abducted while walking to a concert at Evergreen State College; body left (according to Bundy) at Taylor Mountain site, but never found. However, there is speculation that the partial remains of an unidentified female discovered near Eatonville, Washington on August 29, 1978, could have belonged to Manson. Remains and clothing were reportedly destroyed on May 10, 1985, before a positive forensic identification could be made.
 April 17: Susan Elaine Rancourt (18): Disappeared after attending an evening advisors' meeting at Central Washington State College; skull and mandible recovered at Taylor Mountain site in 1975.
 May 6: Roberta Kathleen Parks (22): Vanished from Oregon State University in Corvallis, Oregon; skull and mandible recovered at Taylor Mountain site in 1975.
 June 1: Brenda Carol Ball (22): Disappeared after leaving the Flame Tavern in Burien; skull and mandible recovered at Taylor Mountain site in 1975.
 June 11: Georgann (often misspelled "Georgeann") Hawkins (18): Abducted from an alley behind her sorority house, UW; skeletal remains identified by Bundy as those of Hawkins recovered at Issaquah site.
 July 14: Janice Ann Ott (23): Abducted from Lake Sammamish State Park in broad daylight; skeletal remains recovered at Issaquah site in 1974.
 July 14: Denise Marie Naslund (19): Abducted four hours after Ott from the same park; skeletal remains recovered at Issaquah site in 1974.

Utah 
 October 18: Melissa Anne Smith (17): Vanished from Midvale, Utah; body found nine days later on a hillside in Summit Park.
 October 31: Laura Ann Aime (17): Disappeared from Lehi, Utah; body discovered by hikers in American Fork Canyon.
 November 8: Carol DaRonch (18): Attempted abduction in Murray, Utah; escaped from Bundy's car and survived.

1975

Utah, Colorado, Idaho 
 January 12: Caryn Eileen Campbell (23): Disappeared from a hotel hallway in Snowmass, Colorado; body discovered 36 days later on a dirt road near the hotel.
 May 6: Lynette Dawn Culver (12): Abducted from Alameda Junior High School in Pocatello, Idaho; body thrown (according to Bundy) into what authorities believe to be the Snake River, but never found.

1978

Florida 
 January 15: Margaret Elizabeth Bowman (21): Bludgeoned and then strangled as she slept, Chi Omega sorority, FSU (no secondary crime scene).
 January 15: Lisa Levy (20): Bludgeoned, strangled and sexually assaulted as she slept, Chi Omega sorority, FSU (no secondary crime scene).
 January 15: Karen Chandler (21): Bludgeoned as she slept, Chi Omega sorority, FSU; survived.
 January 15: Kathy Kleiner (21): Bludgeoned as she slept, Chi Omega sorority, FSU; survived.
 January 15: Cheryl Thomas (21): Bludgeoned as she slept, eight blocks from Chi Omega; survived.

Suspected 
Bundy remains a suspect in several unsolved homicides and disappearances, and is likely responsible for others that may never be identified; in 1987 he confided to Keppel that there were "some murders" that he would "never talk about", because they were committed "too close to home", "too close to family", or involved "victims who were very young". Minutes before his execution, Hagmaier queried Bundy about unsolved homicides in New Jersey, Vermont (the Curran case), Illinois, Texas, and Miami, Florida. Bundy provided directions—later proven inaccurate—to Susan Curtis's burial site in Utah, but denied involvement in any of the open cases. In 2011, Bundy's complete DNA profile, obtained from a vial of his blood found in an evidence vault, was added to the FBI's DNA database for future reference in these and other unsolved murder cases:

 Ann Marie Burr, aged 8, vanished from her Tacoma home on August 31, 1961, when Bundy was 14. An unknown tennis shoe imprint was found by the overturned bench used to enter her house. Due to the small size of the shoe, police believed the perpetrator was a teenager or youth. The Burr house was on Bundy's newspaper delivery route. The victim's father was certain that he saw Bundy in a ditch at a construction site on the nearby UPS campus the morning his daughter disappeared. Other circumstantial evidence implicates Bundy as well, but detectives familiar with the case have never agreed on the likelihood of his involvement. Keppel has observed that the Burr case fits all three categories of murders Bundy would "never talk about": "too close to home", "too close to family", and "very young". Speaking in the third person, Bundy claimed that he had "stalked, strangled, and sexually mauled his first victim, an eight-year-old girl," in an orchard, during audiotaped discussions with journalists Michaud and Aynesworth in 1980 and 1981; Ann's family had lived next to an orchard. Burr's mother informed Bundy in a 1986 letter that she believed he was responsible for killing Ann. "You have nothing more to lose in this world,” she wrote. “Will you write to me regarding Ann Marie?” In response, Bundy categorically denied killing Ann. “First and foremost, I do not know what happened to your daughter Ann Marie,” Bundy wrote. “I had nothing to do with her disappearance.” Forensic testing of material evidence from the Burr crime scene in 2011 yielded insufficient intact DNA sequences for comparison with Bundy's, and as such his involvement remains speculative.
 Flight attendants Lisa E. Wick and Lonnie Ree Trumbull, both 20, were bludgeoned with a piece of lumber as they slept in their basement apartment in Seattle's Queen Anne neighborhood in the early morning hours of June 23, 1966. Trumbull died. In retrospect, Keppel noted many similarities to the Chi Omega crime scene. The crime's modus operandi was also similarly comparable to Bundy's earlier verifiable assaults on murder victim Lynda Healy and survivor Karen Sparks, who were brutally bludgeoned while in their beds in Seattle basement apartments. Wick, who suffered permanent memory loss as a result of the attack, later contacted Rule: "I know that it was Ted Bundy who did that to us," she wrote, "but I can't tell you how I know." However, police records state that when Bundy's fingerprints were compared in January 1977 to those left at the crime scene, they did not match. In the absence of incriminating evidence, Bundy's involvement remains unconfirmed.
 Vacationing Pennsylvania college friends Susan Margarite Davis and Elizabeth Perry, both 19, were stabbed to death in Somers Point, New Jersey. The women had been visiting Ocean City and were on their way back to Pennsylvania at about 4:30 a.m. on May 30, 1969, but they stopped at the Somers Point Diner for breakfast. They left the diner one hour later and vanished. Davis was naked with her clothing and accessories in a pile beside her. Except for her missing underwear, Perry was fully-dressed. Bundy attended Temple University from January through May 1969 and apparently did not move west until after Memorial Day weekend. While his accounts of his earliest crimes varied considerably between interviews, he told forensic psychologist Art Norman that his first murder victims were two women in the Philadelphia area. Biographer Richard Larsen believed that Bundy committed the murders using his feigned-injury ruse, based on an investigator's interview with Julia, Bundy's aunt: Ted, she said, was wearing a leg cast due to an automobile accident on the weekend of the homicides, and therefore could not have traveled from Philadelphia to the Jersey Shore; there is no official record of any such accident. Bundy is considered a "strong suspect", but the case remains open.
 Rita Patricia Curran, a 24-year-old elementary school teacher and part-time motel maid, was murdered in her basement apartment on July 19, 1971, in Burlington, Vermont; she had been strangled, bludgeoned and raped. The time of death was later given as approximately midnight. The location of the motel where she worked (adjacent to Bundy's birthplace, the Elizabeth Lund Home for Unwed Mothers) and similarities to known Bundy crime scenes led retired FBI agent John Bassett to propose him as a suspect. Bundy told Keppel that he murdered a young woman in 1971 in Burlington when he was there to obtain information about his birth, but denied specific involvement in the Curran case to Hagmaier on the eve of his execution. Inquiring as to Bundy's involvement in Curran's death, Curran's sister wrote a telegram to Florida's Death Row. In a response, the FBI informed her that Bundy had declined to confirm or deny his culpability. No evidence firmly places Bundy in Burlington on that date, but municipal records note that a person named "Bundy" was bitten by a dog that week, and long stretches of Bundy's time—including the summer of 1971—remain unaccounted for. However, Burlington Police Department announced during a press conference in 2023 that Curran’s killer was her next-door neighbour, William DeRoos. Police said they used DNA from a discarded cigarette butt found at the crime scene to identify DeRoos as the culprit of the slaying that at one time was linked to Bundy.
 Joyce LePage, 21, was last seen on the evening of July 22, 1971, when friends dropped her off at her apartment on the campus of Washington State University, where she was an undergraduate. Later, her vehicle would be discovered by police parked four blocks from her residence. Nine months later, her skeletal remains were found wrapped in two “military” blankets, bound with rope, in a deep ravine south of Pullman, Washington. Her remains were also covered with a sizable piece of green shag carpet that had been previously reported missing from Stevens Hall, a women's residence on the WSU campus, which was vacant and undergoing renovations in the summer of 1971. The cause of her death was confirmed to be three knife wounds to her chest, which was determined during an FBI forensic examination of her bones. Police concluded from the available evidence that she had been stabbed to death in Stevens Hall before being wrapped in carpet and taken to the ravine. Multiple suspects—including Bundy—have "never been cleared", according to investigators. According to reports, a "yellow VW Bug" and a person matching Bundy's description were spotted on campus at the time of the disappearance. LePage's case was briefly brought up by Keppel in January 1989, but Bundy did not either confirm or deny his involvement in the murder. Whitman County authorities have said that Bundy remains a suspect.
 Kerry May-Hardy, 22, disappeared whilst hitchhiking on June 24, 1972, from Capitol Hill, Washington near Seattle. According to police, she was married at the time and her disappearance was reported to the Seattle Police Department by her mother. May-Hardy's skeletal remains were unearthed on September 6, 2010, by construction machinery, in a grave measuring two feet or less in depth. At the time May-Hardy was reported missing, the site had been used for logging, and it was heavily wooded. A facial reconstruction was later created in hopes that she would be recognized. May-Hardy's DNA was obtained in 2004 from family members, initially for the investigation of the Green River murders, committed by Gary Ridgway between the 1970s and 1990s. Her family reported a resemblance to the facial reconstruction. DNA from the skeleton matched the family's sample on June 1, 2011. The identification was announced two days later, and her relatives announced plans to bury her remains. The location where her body was found was in the general proximity where Bundy discarded known victims near Interstate 90; only five miles from his mass grave at Taylor Mountain. Kerry also matched Bundy’s supposed victim preference: pretty, with long, straight hair parted in the middle. However, Bundy's involvement in her death is merely conjecture with notable forensic psychologist, Dr. Park Dietz, expressing skepticism over the notion. Bundy was executed in 1989, never mentioning involvement, and Ridgway has not reportedly commented on her case.
 Rita Lorraine Jolly, 17, disappeared from West Linn, Oregon, on June 29, 1973, after leaving her residence to go for a walk; Vicki Lynn Hollar, 24, disappeared from Eugene, Oregon, on August 20, 1973. She was last seen getting into her car at a parking lot en route to her apartment. Bundy confessed to two homicides in Oregon without identifying the victims. Oregon detectives suspected that they were Jolly and Hollar, but were unable to obtain an interview with Bundy to confirm it. Both women remain classified as missing.
 Katherine Merry Devine, 14, was abducted on November 25, 1973, and her body was found the next month in the Capitol State Forest near Olympia, Washington. Brenda Joy Baker, 14, was last seen hitchhiking near Puyallup, on May 27, 1974; her body was found in Millersylvania State Park a month later. Her throat had been slit. Though Bundy was widely believed responsible for both murders, he told Keppel that he had no knowledge of either case. DNA analysis led to the arrest and conviction of William E. Cosden for Devine's murder in 2002. The Baker homicide remains unsolved.
 Sandra Jean Weaver, 19, a Wisconsin native who had been living in Tooele, Utah, was last seen in Salt Lake City on July 1, 1974; her nude body was discovered the following day near Grand Junction, Colorado. Sources conflict on whether Bundy mentioned Weaver's name during the death row interviews. Her murder remains unsolved.
Gas station receipts place Bundy in nearby Golden on the day Cooley disappeared. She is included in some compilations of Bundy victims, but Jefferson County authorities say the evidence is inconclusive and continue to treat her homicide as a cold case.
 Shelley Kay Robertson, 24, failed to show up for work in Golden on July 1, 1975. Her nude, decomposed body was found in August,  inside a mine on Berthoud Pass near Winter Park Resort by two mining students. In Salt Lake City in 1976, Bundy was questioned about the Robertson case by Clear Creek County detective Bob Denning. Bundy said, "I don't want to talk about that." Denning has stated he is "99% sure" that Shelley’s killer was Bundy. Gas station receipts place Bundy in the area at the time, but there is no direct evidence of his involvement; the case remains open.
Her suspected kidnapping did not fit the profile of Bundy's past crimes in a number of respects, and he explicitly denied involvement in this case during the interviews he gave from his death row cell.
 Debbie Smith, 17, was last seen in Salt Lake City in early February 1976, shortly before the DaRonch trial began; her body was found near the Salt Lake City International Airport on April 1, 1976. Though listed as a Bundy victim by some sources, her murder remains officially unsolved.

In media

Books 
 Rule, Ann (1980). The Stranger Beside Me. W.W. Norton and Company Inc. 
 Kendall, Elizabeth (1981). The Phantom Prince: My Life with Ted Bundy. Abrams & Chronicle Books. 
 Sullivan, Kevin M (2009). The Bundy Murders: A Comprehensive History. McFarland and Company Inc. 
 Michaud, Stephen G., and Hugh Aynesworth (2000). Ted Bundy: Conversations with a Killer. Authorlink Press. 
 Nelson, Polly (2019). Defending the Devil: My Story as Ted Bundy's Last Lawyer. Echo Point Books & Media. 
 Carlisle, Al (2017). Violent Mind: The 1976 Psychological Assessment of Ted Bundy. Genius Book Publishing. 
 Michaud, Stephen G., and Hugh Aynesworth (2012). The Only Living Witness: The True Story of Serial Sex Killer Ted Bundy. Authorlink.

Films 
 The Deliberate Stranger (1986), played by Mark Harmon
 Ted Bundy (2002), played by Michael Reilly Burke
 The Stranger Beside Me (2003), played by Billy Campbell
 The Riverman (2004), played by Cary Elwes
 Bundy: An American Icon (2008), played by Corin Nemec
 The Capture of the Green River Killer (2008), played by James Marsters
 Extremely Wicked, Shockingly Evil and Vile (2019), played by Zac Efron
 Ted Bundy: American Boogeyman (2021), played by Chad Michael Murray
 No Man of God (2021), played by Luke Kirby

Music 
 The song "Ted, Just Admit it..." by Jane's Addiction
The song "Lotta True Crime" by Penelope Scott references Ted Bundy
The song "Video Crimes" by Tin Machine references Bundy.
The song "Ted Bundy" by Theory of a Deadman

Television 
 Ted Bundy: Devil In Disguise.
 Ted Bundy: An American Monster.
 Ted Bundy: What Happened.
 Conversations with a Killer: The Ted Bundy Tapes, Netflix documentary series (2019)
 Ted Bundy: Falling for a Killer, Amazon Prime Video documentary series (2020)

See also 

 Capital punishment in Florida
 List of people executed in Florida
 List of serial killers in the United States

Citations

General and cited sources 

 
 
 
 
 (Elizabeth Kloepfer, writing under a pseudonym)
  Updated after the arrest and confession of the Green River killer, Gary Ridgway.
 
 
 
 
 
 
  Transcripts of the authors' Death Row interviews with Bundy

External links 

 
 FBI file on Ted Bundy at vault.fbi.gov
 Wanted by FBI – Theodore Robert Bundy, FBI
 Audiotapes of Bundy's 1989 confessions
 

Ted Bundy
1946 births
1989 deaths
1974 murders in the United States
1975 murders in the United States
1978 murders in the United States
20th-century executions by Florida
20th-century executions of American people
American escapees
American male criminals
American murderers of children
American people convicted of kidnapping
American rapists
Criminals from Philadelphia
Criminals from Tacoma, Washington
Escapees from Colorado detention
Child sexual abuse in the United States
Executed American serial killers
Executed people from Vermont
FBI Ten Most Wanted Fugitives
Fugitives
Human trophy collecting
Male serial killers
Methodists from Washington (state)
Necrophiles
People convicted of murder by Florida
People excommunicated by the Church of Jesus Christ of Latter-day Saints
People executed by Florida by electric chair
People from Burlington, Vermont
People from Salt Lake City
People with antisocial personality disorder
People with narcissistic personality disorder
University of Puget Sound alumni
University of Utah alumni
University of Washington College of Arts and Sciences alumni
Violence against women in the United States
Washington (state) Republicans